Xia Tonghe (18681925) was a Chinese scholar and calligrapher active in the Qing dynasty. He was a member of the secret society Hop Sing Tong.

References

1868 births
1925 deaths
19th-century Chinese artists
Qing dynasty scholars